The 1977 Intercontinental Cup was an association football tie held over two legs in March and August 1978 between Boca Juniors, winners of the 1977 Copa Libertadores, and Borussia Mönchengladbach, runners-up of the 1976–77 European Cup. European Cup winners Liverpool declined to participate.

Background
As Liverpool declined to participate, Borussia Mönchengladbach was the team appointed to play the series. Due to schedule problems, the Cup was not played until 1978, with the second leg having been held more than four months after the first game in Buenos Aires.

Previously to those series, Borussia had won the Bundesliga three consecutive times (1974–77) with notable players such as Berti Vogts and Danish forward Allan Simonsen, awarded with Ballon d'Or in 1977.

As part of the preparation for the series, Boca Juniors manager, Juan Carlos Lorenzo, sent a friend of him to Borussia's training camp (pretending to be a local journalist due to his knowledge of German language) to watch the team in action. The envoy then sent Lorenzo a detailed report about Borussia's players, their technical characteristics and skills on the field.

First leg
The first game was held in La Bombonera, with Boca Juniors taking advantage with a goal by Ernesto Mastrángelo, but Borussia scored two goals for a partial 2–1 win until Jorge Ribolzi scored for the 2–2 that would be the final result.

Match details

Second leg

In October, Boca Juniors travelled to Germany to play the second leg, with the media being sceptical about a victory there. As Borussia's stadium was being refurbished, the match played at Wildparkstadion, which was remarkable for being the stadium with the best lighting throughout Germany by then.

Coach Juan Carlos Lorenzo surprised everyone when he decided to replace Francisco Sa, an experienced but slow player (with 33 years old) by younger and faster José Luis Tesare. He also put three attacking players (resulting in a 4–3–3 formation), something infrequent by those times. 

The plan designed by Lorenzo was a real aim so Boca Juniors scored three goals for a 3–0 (Felman, Mastrángelo and Salinas) at the end of first half. Nevertheless, during the first 15 minutes of the match Borussia played much better than Boca Juniors but the German match could not score a goal in despite of their dominance over the rival.

One of the key players of the match was Darío Felman, who also scored a goal. Felman, on loan to Valencia CF by then, had not attend the first game in La Bombonera but Alberto J. Armando convinced him to play the second leg. Felman gave Ernesto Mastrangelo a precise pass to score the second goal of the match.

At the end of the match, Borussia manager, Udo Lattek stated that "Boca Juniors was a more mature and intelligent team than us".

Match details

Aftermath

Boca Juniors's victory was acclaimed throughout Argentina, even by supporters of rival clubs. It was the first intercontinental title for the club and the third for a big five club of Argentina after the victories of Racing and Independiente in 1967 and 1973 respectively.

After their return from Germany, Boca Juniors players went directly to the club so they had to play Newell's Old Boys in the Metropolitano tournament, which would be finally won by Quilmes.

See also
1976–77 European Cup
1977 Copa Libertadores

References

1977–78 in European football
1977 in South American football
1977
Boca Juniors matches
Borussia Mönchengladbach matches
International club association football competitions hosted by Germany
International club association football competitions hosted by Argentina
1977–78 in German football
1977 in Argentine football
1977
1970s in Buenos Aires
March 1978 sports events in Europe
August 1978 sports events in Europe
1977
Sports competitions in Baden-Württemberg
1970s in Baden-Württemberg
Sport in Karlsruhe
20th century in Karlsruhe
Argentine football clubs in international competitions